Katha Parayumpol is a 2007 Indian Malayalam-language comedy drama film directed by M. Mohanan, written by Sreenivasan, and co-produced by Sreenivasan and Mukesh. It stars Sreenivasan, Meena and Mammootty. The film was a commercial success.

The plot follows barber Balan, a poor villager who once shared a strong friendship with present-day film actor Ashok Raj, and later parted away. Decades later, the Raj returns to the village to participate in a film's shooting. Whilst the villagers are excited to see the actor, Balan distances himself fearing that his old friend would have forgotten him.

Plot
The story revolves around the life of a barber named Balan in a small village called Melukavu in Kerala. The barber is financially constrained and has to raise a family with three children. His wife Sridevi is beautiful and belongs to a high caste who had eloped with him. He is not able to cope with the competition from a new air-conditioned beauty salon/parlor opened by Sarasan, opposite his shop. He does not get a license or a loan for the salon. He is in debt and is ridiculed by everyone in the village. Life is tough for him – he does not have money for a full square meal, leave alone for his children's school fees

One day the village wakes up to the news that a Malayalam movie is going to be shot there, with superstar Ashok Raj as the hero.  News spread that Ashok Raj is coming to the village for the ten-day shoot. The whole village is excited preparing for the superstar's arrival. Slowly, a word spread around that Balan and Ashok Raj are childhood friends. Balan, who was a laughing stock, suddenly becomes the center of attention. Everyone goes out of their way to help and please Balan, so that they can get a chance to meet and get various favors from his superstar friend. Balan gets under immense pressure because of this attitude of the villagers. Even his family starts asking him to meet and renew the friendship with Ashok Raj. Balan tries his best to approach the superstar, but his honesty and status of barber does not allow him to pass through the heavy security. When the villagers know that Balan is not able to help them, they start thinking that he was lying about his friendship with Ashok Raj and take back their support, abusing and making even more fun of him. Balan, depressed and sad, goes back to his old self.

Ashok Raj is invited to a function in the local school where he gives a ceremonial speech. He talks about the present day life, modernization, the state of good people etc., opening the eyes of everyone to the sad truth of people's behavior. During the speech, he reveals the fact that Balan was indeed his best friend who was the first person to realize the acting talent in him and tearing up in front of the audience, saying that he has been missing Balan all this while. That evening, Ashok Raj meets his long-lost friend Balan at his house, and Balan becomes an overnight hero in the eyes of his village.

Cast

Sreenivasan as E.P. Balachandran aka Balan, a Barber
Meena as Sreedevi Balachandran, Balachandran's wife
Mammootty as Superstar Ashok Raj
Mukesh as Venu
Innocent as Eappachan Muthalali
Jagadish as Sarasan
Shafna as Sona Balachandran
Revathy Sivakumar as Seena Balachandran
Jagathy Sreekumar as Government Officer
K. P. A. C. Lalitha as School Principal 
Suraj Venjaramoodu as Pappan Kudamaloor
Mamukkoya as Devasya 
 Kripa as Shamna 
Shivaji Guruvayoor as Kuriakose
 Kottayam Nazeer as Idikkatta Varkey
 Augustine as Scariah Thomas
 Sadiq as Police Officer 
 Vettukili Prakash as Villager
 Manikandan Pattambi as a Villager
Salim Kumar as Das Vadakkemuri
 Majeed as Balan's Neighbour
 Jasveer Kaur as Lead actress in  the song Mambulli , along with Superstar Ashok Raj (Cameo appearance)
 Vishnu Unnikrishnan as a student in tuition class

Production
The film was mainly shot at various locations in Melukavu.

Soundtrack
The film featured a successful soundtrack composed by M. Jayachandran.
"Maambulli" - Swetha, Vineeth Sreenivasan (Lyrics: Gireesh Puthenchery)
"Vethyasthanam" - Pradeep Palluruthy (Lyrics: Anil Panachooran)

Box office
The film was both commercial and critical success.<ref>{{cite news|url=https://www.news18.com/amp/photogallery/movies/mohanlals-drishyam-to-mammoottys-katha-parayumpol-southern-films-that-have-been-remade-many-times-1022255.html|title=Mohanlal's 'Drishyam' to Mammootty's Katha Parayumpol' : Southern films that have been remade many times|work=IBN Live|date=18 June 2015}}</ref> It was released in 40 centers on the occasion of Christmas alongside Flash, Kangaroo and Romeo and emerged the winner. In 12 weeks, the film grossed 1.03 crore from Thiruvananthapuram and Kozhikode. The film ran for 150 days in theatres.

Remakes
Following the success it enjoyed in Malayalam, the film was remade in Tamil as Kuselan and Telugu as Kathanayakudu. Sreenivasan's role was played by Pasupathi  in Tamil and Jagapathi Babu in Telugu. Mammootty's role was played by Rajnikanth in both Tamil and in Telugu. But both these versions strayed from the original with many extra characters and changes in the storyline resulting in dismal failures.

Meena reprised her role from original movie in both Tamil and Telugu remakes along with Shafna and Revathy Sivakumar , who played the role of her children.

Noted Director Priyadarshan was highly impressed with the film that he immediately bought rights for the Hindi remake of the film. Priyadarshan had screened the film to noted actor, Shah Rukh Khan, who was impressed with the film that he signed onto the Hindi remake, Billu'' as well as producing it under his Red Chillies Entertainment. Khan suggested that Priyan should stick to the original script sans any alterations. Also, 3 item numbers by Kareena Kapoor, Deepika Padukone and Priyanka Chopra are to be added into the film's promotion. Movie completed 130 days in theatres.

Noted Kannada actor/director, Ramesh Aravind announced the remake in Kannada as well. However it failed to materialise.

References

External links

2000s Malayalam-language films
Malayalam films remade in other languages
2007 directorial debut films
2007 films
Indian buddy comedy-drama films
Films scored by M. Jayachandran
Films with screenplays by Sreenivasan
2000s buddy comedy-drama films